Nanhermanniidae is a family of mites belonging to the order Sarcoptiformes.

Genera:
 Bicyrthermannia Hammer, 1979
 Cosmohermannia Aoki & Yoshida, 1970
 Cyrthermannia Balogh, 1958
 Dendrohermannia Balogh, 1985
 Masthermannia Berlese, 1913
 Nanhermannia Berlese, 1913
 Notohermannia Balogh, 1985

References

Sarcoptiformes